Löderup is a locality situated in Ystad Municipality, Skåne County, Sweden with 550 inhabitants in 2010.

Medieval Löderup Church lies in Löderup.

References 

Populated places in Ystad Municipality
Populated places in Skåne County